Hypoproxynops is a genus of parasitic flies in the family TachinidaeHypodoria is a genus of parasitic flies in the family Tachinidae.

Species
Hypoproxynops rufiventris Townsend, 1927

Distribution
Brazil.

References

Diptera of South America
Monotypic Brachycera genera
Exoristinae
Tachinidae genera
Taxa named by Charles Henry Tyler Townsend